Soubakaniédougou is a town in southwestern Burkina Faso. By road, it is about 40 km south-west of the town of Banfora, and about 125 km south-west of the city of Bobo-Dioulasso. The town has a population of 9,423. It is the capital of Soubakaniédougou Department.

References

External links
Satellite map at Maplandia.com

Populated places in the Cascades Region
Comoé Province